Oleona, originally spelled Oleana, is an unincorporated community in Potter County, Pennsylvania, United States established by the Norwegian violinist Ole Bull.

History
During his stay in the United States, the violinist Ole Bull purchased a large piece of land in Potter County, Pennsylvania, in 1852. He gave it the name Oleana or New Norway. Bull's intention was to invite Scandinavian immigrants to build and settle there. It soon became apparent that the land was not suitable for settlement at all. In the first year, up to 700 immigrants settled and tried to establish new homes there, roads were created, and a sawmill and other facilities were built. However, already after one year, the settlers realized that it was not possible to make a living because of the poor soil, and so they moved on, many to Wisconsin.

When Bull arrived in New York in 1852, he was deeply disappointed that the Storting had rejected his application for support for a theater he himself had started in Bergen; namely, the National Theater. Instead, he now devoted himself to the New Norway project high up in the Allegheny Mountains, which Henrik Wergeland had written a beautiful poem about. He purchased the area there with the New York attorney John Hopper (the son of Isaac Hopper) and a third party. He received 11,144 acres for a total of $10,388, and he became chairman of an operating company with John F. Cowan as manager. Bull's contribution to the operating company was $25,000 because everything from roads and homes to a church and a school, a mill, and canals were needed here. In the neighboring county there was a foundry, and the company hoped for a profitable government contract for casting 10,000 cannons. They also hoped for railways and to find ore.

The first settlers arrived in September 1852. They received $15 a month, as well as board and lodging. They were allowed to buy land at an introductory price of $3 per acre, rising to $10 after a few years. Bull also selected a plot for his own house. "We are here to found a new Norway, dedicated to freedom and independence, and protected by the glorious flag of America," he declared at the inauguration on September 8, 1852. However, to own land in Pennsylvania one had to be a US citizen, or declare that one wanted to become so. Bull resolved this issue by making such a statement at a separate ceremony in Philadelphia. This displeased many Norwegians. Bull had an agent in New York and one in Norway to recruit new colonists, but his income failed because he also had an agent as well as a singer at his concerts. Previously, he could earn up to $3,000 at one concert, albeit gross. However, now he was lucky if he was left with $500 in profit. In the colony there were twelve deaths the first winter and meager times, while Bull dreamed about buying an abandoned iron works and planned a polytechnic school with professors from Europe, as well as its own sanatorium.

In March 1853, money for the settlers' wages stopped coming in. On the other hand, the deed was in order, but then it turned out that the agreement contained three parcels that were not included in the purchase. These exceptions amounted to more than 650 acres; namely, the valley bottoms in the area, where agriculture could be practiced in the otherwise very hilly terrain. Oleana itself and the plot where Bull's own house stood were not included in the purchase either, but belonged to Cowan. It was not until May 17 that Bull showed up and personally distributed $7,000 in outstanding salaries and other receivables. He agreed to return on Independence Day, July 4, but instead went to New York, ill and bankrupt. The project was completed on his part, and he preferred to inform his attorney Lucius E. Bulkley about this instead of the settlers. When he found out in the fall how bad things were with them, he gave several concerts to raise income for them. Several settlers had almost sued him at the time because of money he owed them. The sheriff in a small town seized Bull's violin due to an unpaid hotel bill of $403, but he was strongly criticized for this by The New York Times. Most settlers went their separate ways; that winter there were fewer than fifty remaining, and later they also left. Bull, on the other hand, is believed to have lost around $70,000 on the project, in addition to the fact that people had lost much of their respect for him. The loss probably could have been avoided if he had sold the timber in the area, but his lawyer Lucius E. Bulkley, who advised him, did not know how valuable this was. Bull was nevertheless not intimidated by the financial loss, and he started an opera in New York two years later—which he lost $12,800 on.

Legacy
There was a lot of talk in Norway about the fantastic opportunities the emigrants were promised in Oleana. However, when it gradually became known that there was no arable land, Ditmar Meidell wrote the satirical song "Oleana" about the attempt to create a model Nordic society in America. This song has been covered from time to time, including in the TV personality and songwriter Erik Bye's repertoire. The song was also translated into English as "Oleanna" and was popularized by former Weavers member Pete Seeger.

Today, large parts of the area are included in Ole Bull State Park.

References

Unincorporated communities in Potter County, Pennsylvania
Unincorporated communities in Pennsylvania